Burden Passage is a marine passage between D'Urville Island and Bransfield Island, off the northeast end of the Antarctic Peninsula. It was charted in 1947 by the Falkland Islands Dependencies Survey and named after Eugene Burden (1892–1979), who, as master of the Trepassey, first navigated the passage in January 1947.

References
 

Straits of Graham Land
Landforms of the Joinville Island group